Manoug Parikian (15 September 1920 - 24 December 1987) was a British concert violinist and violin professor.

Early life
Parikian was born in Mersin to Armenian parents. He studied in London.

Career
Parikian made his solo début in 1947 and led several orchestras - the Liverpool Philharmonic (1947–48), London's Philharmonia Orchestra (1949–57), the Yorkshire Sinfonia from 1976 to 1978 - and was musical director of the Manchester Camerata from 1980 to 1984. He also led the English Opera Group Orchestra between 1949 and 1951, and participated in various Aldeburgh Festival concerts as a chamber musician as well as in opera productions.

He was an admired teacher at the Royal Academy of Music. He also championed contemporary composers, many of whom wrote works for him: examples include Thea Musgrave's Colloquy (1960), Gordon Crosse's Violin Concerto No. 2, Alexander Goehr's Violin Concerto (1961–62) and Hugh Wood's Violin Concerto.

Benjamin Britten also composed for Parikian a cadenza to Mozart's Adagio for Violin and Orchestra K261 in 1951, and was assisted by Parikian when revising the solo part of his own violin concerto, originally composed in 1938-39.

Personal life
In 1957, he married the musician turned antiquarian bookseller Diana Carbutt, who was divorced from the conductor Neville Marriner, with whom she had one son, the clarinettist Andrew Marriner, and one daughter, the writer Susie Harries. They had two sons together.

Parikian died in Oxford in 1987, aged 67. On the day of his death (Christmas Eve) BBC2 featured a performance of his, in the Antonio Stradivari Gala Celebration. His death was announced after the broadcast.

Notes

Sources
 

1920 births
1987 deaths
Armenian violinists
British violinists
British male violinists
Turkish violinists
People from Mersin
Musicians from London
Turkish people of Armenian descent
British people of Armenian descent
Academics of the Royal Academy of Music
20th-century violinists
20th-century English musicians
20th-century British male musicians
20th-century British musicians
Turkish emigrants to the United Kingdom